Rastriya Beema Sansthan  is the first life insurance company in Nepal. Established by the Government of Nepal.

They are operating in Nepal through 23 branches located at various part of nepal..

Life Insurance Product Offered by Company
 Endowment plan
 Whole life plan
 Child plan
 Money back plan

References

External links
 Official Website
 Rastriya Beema Sansthan Notices

Insurance
Insurance companies based in Nepal
1967 establishments in Nepal